Illnau is a railway station in the Swiss canton of Zurich and municipality of Illnau-Effretikon. The station, which takes its name from the village of Illnau, is located on the Effretikon to Hinwil railway line.

Service 
The station is an intermediate stop on Zurich S-Bahn service S3. During peak periods it is also served by S-Bahn service S19. On weekends, there is a nighttime S-Bahn service (SN8) offered by ZVV. Summary of all S-Bahn services:

 Zürich S-Bahn:
 Nighttime S-Bahn (only during weekends):

References

External links 

Illnau station on Swiss Federal Railway's web site

Illnau
Illnau
Illnau-Effretikon